The Green Quarter is an area of Manchester, England, just north of the city centre between Cheetham, Strangeways and the River Irk.

From the mid-nineteenth century, the area, then known as Red Bank, was a slum housing impoverished Jewish immigrants from Eastern Europe, but is now home to digital start-ups and e-commerce businesses, new apartments, microbreweries, gin distilleries and restaurants.

References

Areas of Manchester